The Akakhel, pronounced Akaa Khel or Akakhail (Pashto and Urdu: اکاخیل,آقاخیل), are a Pashtun sub-tribe of the Ghilji/Ghilzais confederation. Their mother language is Pashto. In the early 20th century, the tribe was generally pastoral. The Akakhel are one of the largest Ghilji Pashtun subtribes. A reasonable majority of those who were living on the Durand Line migrated since 1900 into Khyber Pakhtunkhwa, Balochistan and Punjab provinces of Pakistan to Sikander Abad (Jarra Kalay) Charsadda,Peshawar, Maidan Lower Dir,Swat(Barikot) Abbottabad, Nowshera, Mardan, Attock, Rawalpindi, Islamabad, Gujranwala, Gojra, Faisalabad, Lahore, Multan, Hyderabad, Karachi and Quetta.
The exact population number of this clan is not known; however, it is estimated to be around 2 million all around the world The population of this tribe primarily lives in Pakistan and Afghanistan. 85% live in Pakistan and about 1% or 2% live in Afghanistan and remaining 13% lives in England, Germany, United Arab Emirates, China, Malaysia, Canada and United States of America.

History 

Aka, Sulaiman, Ahmad and Ali were four brothers, from Akaa the subtribe Akakhel, from Sulaiman the subtribe slemankhel, from Ahmad the subtribe Ahmadzi and from Ali the subtribe alizi commonly called Alozi descended.

Aka who was a Sufi Saint and his shrine is located in Serobi. He had seven sons Their names were following Toor Baba, Gander baba, Noor, Sikander, Qaozai, Sleem, Mirza and Hassan. From these sons the Akakhel tribe is sub-divided into Ganderkhel, Sikanderkhel, Maeenkhel or Moeenkhel Sleemikhel and Hassankhel. 

Ancestors of Toor baba then is divided into Maeenkhel or "Moeenkhel" and Manikhel after the names of his sons Momin And Maeen. The Maeenkhel is then subdivided into Abdullahwal, Niaziwal Sifatwal and Badakwal after the names of his sons Abdullah, Niazai, Sifat and Badak. taking Niaziwal tribe is then divided into Aslamwal, Azamwal,
Akramwal and Nizam wal. aslam had then four sons namely Jabbar, Ilyaas, Pasta Khan and Misri. Misri was never married thus he had no sons.
Jabbar had three sons namely Jan nisar khan, Muhamaad shah khan and Maghul Khan. Pista khan had two sons Abullah jan and Sher Muhammad . Ilyaas had two sons Mirza and Kareem. 

Gander baba Ganderkhel had four sons named Ahmad, Baba, Biland, Noor Muhammad, the Ahmad family known as Ahmadwal the Baba family known as Baba khel the Biland family known as Bilandwal and Noor Muhammad family known as Noorakwal the Ahmwadwal also known as (Shangyan) the Toor Baba, Gander baba, Noor, Sikander, Qaozai, Mirza and Hassan was settle in jaindai near to Tangi district Charsadda. 

In early of 1900 their business was dry fruit from Afghanistan to Pakistan and to new Delhi on camel in winter season, at start of Summer in April they used to buy chaliya pan in Delhi and bring it to Lahore Karachi and sold it in Lahore and Karachi. 

In 1947 the all families of Toor Baba, Gander baba, Noor, Sikander, Qaozai, Mirza and Hassan was transfer to other cities in time of partition of Pakistan and India in 1947 to Sikander Abad (formerly known as Jarra Kalay) Charsadda,Mangora, Barikot but the Aka khel of barikot has also migrated from chakesar shagla valley to Barikot swat in early 16th century (Swat) Nowshera, Mardan,  Abbottabad,  Attock, Rawalpindi, Islamabad, Gujranwala, Gojra, Faisalabad, Lahore, Multan, Hyderabad, Karachi, and Quetta. Most of them were settled in Peshawar, Mardan, Charsadda, Rawalpindi, Islamabad and Karachi. Most of Ganderkhel live in Peshawar,Rawalpindi and Karachi.

Sikander Khel further divided into small-tribes. Arsala-waal from the son Arsala Khan, Paaenda-khel (or Paanda-khel) from the son Paaenda Muhammad Khan, Malak-waal from the son Malak Khan.

Distribution 

Tribal Research Cell of Government of Khyber Pakhtunkhwa, Pakistan, Home and Tribal Affairs Department, have provided the available old/historical record copies of the Akakhail tribe since British era i.e. 1932–34.In which it is clearly stated that: (the original words of the copies) "217. The Aka Khel are true Ghilzais and related to the Ali Khel and Sulaiman Khel with whom they are friendly. The association of Aka Khel of Katawaz and Ali Khel with the Sulaiman Khel of Katawaz is so close that, often, when asked to what tribe they belong, they say that they are Sulaiman Khel. The tribe is almost entirely nomadic. Those who come from Katawaz to the Damam of Dera Ismail Khan in winter use the Gomal route, and they form only a comparatively small portion of the whole tribe. Many of the Aka Khel spend the summer in the Hazarajat and in autumn take their families to Ningarhar, carrying on trade between Kabul and Peshawar. 

The population of this clan is estimated at 1 million worldwide. About 70% of the Akakhel population lives in Afghanistan and about 25% lives in Pakistan. The remainder live in England, Germany, United Arab Emirates, China, Malaysia, Canada and the United States of America.
People of Aka Khel tribes living in Pakistan have their basic roots in Pakistan community but are still facing problems of self recognition and identity rights just because of their resemblance in pushto dialect to the afghan people.

References

 Tribal Research Cell, Government of Khyber Pakhtunkhwa, Home and Tribal Affairs Department, TRC(HD) 3-25/81, Volume IV, Peshawar, 12 March 2013.

Ghilji Pashtun tribes
Pashto-language surnames
Pakistani names